Siddhartha Highway (also referred to as H10, now renamed NH 047) is a major highway in Nepal that connects the Terai region in southern Nepal with the mountain region in northern Nepal. The highway starts at Nepal–India border near Siddharthanagar and terminates at Pokhara. This highway intersects with the east–west Mahendra Highway at Butwal.

The highway construction was started in 1964 and completed in 1971.It was inaugurated by king Birendra on 9 May 1972 CE(25 Baisakh 2029 BS) in Pokhara.It was constructed with Indian assistance. The highway consists of about 34 bridges with the longest bridge over the Kali Gandaki River in Ramdi. The highway takes its name from Siddhartha Gautam (Gautama Buddha). The highway was funded by the government of India.

Route description

The major settlements on the highway are Siddharthanagar, Butwal, Tansen, Waling, Putalibazar, Syangja and Pokhara.

The Butwal–Palpa section of this road consists of rocky terrain and frequent rock-fall which sometimes causes fatal accidents.

The road is considered among top five busiest highways in Nepal. The road is mainly used for transportation of food and agricultural products. People who want to travel to Pokhara generally do not use this highway because of large number of narrow curves and the poor quality of the road.

References

Highways in Nepal
1971 establishments in Nepal